Rita Potts Parks (born 1962) is an American politician serving as a Republican member of the Mississippi State Senate, representing the 4th district since 2012.

Early life and education
Parks was born on December 18, 1962 in Corinth, Mississippi. She attended Alcorn Central High School.  After high school, she went to Northeast Mississippi Community College, graduating with an Associate of Science in Biology in 1982. She entered the University of Mississippi in late 1982 and graduated with a Bachelor of Science in Biology/Biological Sciences in 1985. In 1987, she entered State Technical Institute, earning an Associate of Science in Industrial Engineering in 1989.

Career
Parks ran for election for Mississippi Senate District 4 in 2011, where she ran unopposed in the Republican primary. She won the general election by a narrow margin, earning 50.7% of the vote; she assumed office on January 3, 2012. Her district includes parts of Alcorn County and Tippah County.

For the 2020-2024 Senate term, she serves as the Chair of the Universities and Colleges committee and vice-chair for the Highways and Transportation committee. She is a member for the following others: Accountability, Efficiency, Transparency; Business and Financial Institutions; Ethics; Finance; Medicaid; and Public Health and Welfare.

Political positions 
She voted for changing the Mississippi state flag in 2020.

Personal life
She is a member of the National Rifle Association, the Kiwanis service club, the American Society for Quality, and the Parenteral Drug Association.

Parks is married and has one daughter. She is a Baptist.

References

External links
Official website

Living people
1962 births
People from Corinth, Mississippi
University of Mississippi alumni
Republican Party Mississippi state senators
Women state legislators in Mississippi
21st-century American politicians
21st-century American women politicians